Jermain Jackman (born 10 January 1995) is a British singer and political activist who won the third series of the BBC television singing competition The Voice UK in 2014. His debut album, Jermain Jackman, was released on 23 March 2015. He was twice a candidate for the Labour Party National Executive Committee (NEC) in 2020. He is a member of the Musicians' Union and Unite.

Early life and education
Jackman was born in Hackney, London to an Afro-Guyanese family with four older siblings and a twin sister. He attended the Islington Arts and Media School in Finsbury Park and Sir George Monoux College in Walthamstow, where he trained in music. He then went on to study Politics at the University of Leeds. He graduated from SOAS University of London in 2022.

Music and television

2014: The Voice UK and career beginnings

Jackman was the winner of series 3 of The Voice UK in April 2014, and the first male to win the competition. He beat Christina Marie, who was the favourite. Jackman was given a £100,000 record contract. His cover of "And I Am Telling You I'm Not Going" reached no. 39 on the UK iTunes chart, but finished the week at only number 75 in the charts.

Performances

2014–present: Jermain Jackman and later career
He released an EP of collaborations, Jermain Jackman Sessions, in December 2014 as a free download.

His debut album, Jermain Jackman, was released on 23 March 2015. He released his debut single "How Will I Know" on the same day as the album. He recorded the song around the time of his Grandmother's death. Talking about the song he said "I'd been to New York to visit my Granny the same week, and so my emotions were high in the studio, She was very much in my thoughts as I recorded the single and I think you can hear that in my vocal."

Jackman appeared as a panellist on CBBC's The Dog Ate My Homework in 2015. He later went on to appear on The Voice UK again performing his new single, "How Will I Know", during the first live show in 2015 before Olly Murs, who also performed his own single "Seasons".

In November 2017, Jackman, teamed up with George Sampson, won the jackpot in an episode of Pointless Celebrities.

Politics and activism
Jackman stated that in the future, he would like to be the first singing Prime Minister of the United Kingdom. In March 2016, he said he was spotted by Labour leader Jeremy Corbyn at a school talent show in 2006 and became inspired to work for him and become an MP. In June 2017, Jackman supported a Labour Party rally prior to the 2017 UK general election.

Jackman chaired the Islington Fair Futures Commission from 2017 to 2018, and has chaired the Hackney Young Futures Commission since 2019. He has also been a Youth Advisor for the NCS Trust since 2019. He founded the 1987 Caucus in April 2020, an organisation for young black men in Labour, and is a member of Socialists of Colour.

In February 2020, Jackman announced his bid to replace the retiring Keith Vaz as BAME Representative on the Labour Party NEC. When results for the by-election were released in April of that year, he finished third with 10.66 percent of the vote. In July 2020 he announced another run for the NEC, initially with the aim of being elected as Youth Representative before switching his campaign to Constituency Labour Party (CLP) Representative. His bid was endorsed by Open Labour. He was narrowly unsuccessful in securing one of the nine CLP seats when results were announced in November, finishing eleventh in the ballot.

In 2022, Jackman sought to challenge Carol Sewell for the BAME Representative seat. He explained his decision to withdraw from the contest in an August LabourList article, stating "we're just not practising the type of world we want to see and live in." The trade unions backing Sewell, who received criticism for attempting to downplay the Forde report, had not consulted their BAME members regarding who to endorse, despite Jackman having won the popular vote with this demographic in 2020. Jackman called for "a review and reform of internal processes" and, in light of the report,  urged both the party and unions to do more to tackle institutional racism and "create a truly anti-racist and inclusive... movement", echoing the late Bernie Grant's criticisms.

Discography

Albums

Extended plays

Singles

References

External links

 Official Jermain Jackman Website
 Jermain Jackman Facebook
 Jermain Jackman Twitter
 Jermain Jackman Instagram
 Jermain Jackman Spotify
 Jermain Jackman Vevo

Living people
1995 births
21st-century Black British male singers
Alumni of SOAS University of London
Alumni of the University of Leeds
Black British politicians
English male singers
English people of Guyanese descent
Labour Party (UK) people
People educated at Sir George Monoux College
People from Hackney Central
Singers from London
Trade unionists from London
Unite the Union
The Voice (franchise) winners
The Voice UK contestants